Tetraonchidae is a family of flatworms belonging to the order Dactylogyridea.

Genera:
 Ergenstrema Paperna, 1964
 Tetraonchus Diesing, 1858

References

Platyhelminthes
Platyhelminthes families